Allen W. Wilder (born 1843) was a state legislator, teacher, and lawyer in Texas. He was born into slavery in North Carolina. He was possibly the first African American in Texas to become a lawyer.

He served one term representing Washington County, Texas in the Texas House of Representatives after winning office in the 1872 election. His election to the House in 1876 was overturned.

Somebody shot him with a gun at a ballot counting site, and his arm was amputated.

See also
African-American officeholders during and following the Reconstruction era

References

1843 births
Year of death missing
Members of the Texas House of Representatives
People from North Carolina
19th-century American politicians
American lawyers
African-American state legislators in Texas